Fuqi International (formerly traded as ) is a designer of precious metal (gold and platinum) jewelry for the luxury goods market in China. It also manufactures jewelry items that contain diamonds and other precious stones on a custom-order basis. Fuqi is a Delaware corporation with its principal executive office located in Shenzhen, China. Fuqi operates through its wholly owned subsidiary, Fuqi International Holdings Co., Ltd., a British Virgin Islands corporation and its wholly owned subsidiary, Shenzhen Fuqi Jewelry Co., Ltd., a company established under the laws of China.

History 
Fuqi was founded in 2001 and had its IPO in 2007. As of December 31, 2008 (the date of its last 10-K SEC filing), Fuqi had 69 jewelry retail counters and stores in China and approximately 950 employees. 97% of its revenue came from wholesale jewelry sales.

On March 29, 2011, Fuqi was de-listed from NASDAQ and has been trading on OTC Pink since.

Class action lawsuit
On March 17, 2010, FUQI's shares declined more than 35% overnight, 
following an announcement of the company's accounting errors and internal control deficiencies, to close at $11.90 per share, on trading volume 20 times the usual.

Several class action lawsuits were filed in April, with a consolidated class action complaint filed on Feb 15, 2011, by ABRAHAM, FRUCHTER & TWERSICY, LLP.

Awards 
 "5 Stocks Approaching Greatness" - Motley Fool, March 9, 2010
 “Chinese Famous Brand”, by China Light Product Quality Assurance Center; “Famous Brand in the China Jewelry Industry”, by Gems & Jewelry Trade Association of China; one of the “Shenzhen 300 enterprises with Ultimate Growth”, by Shenzhen City Enterprises Evaluation Association; “China Top Brand” by General Administration of Quality Supervision, Inspection and Quarantine of the People's Republic of China, October 2007

External links

SEC filings
Class action case

References

Companies based in Shenzhen
Companies established in 2001
Jewellery companies of China
Chinese brands